Christopher Randall Gaines (born February 3, 1965) is a former American football linebacker who played one season with the Miami Dolphins of the National Football League (NFL). He was drafted by the Phoenix Cardinals in the fifth round of the 1988 NFL Draft. He played college football at Vanderbilt University and attended DuPont High School in Hermitage, Tennessee. Gaines was also a member of the Toronto Argonauts of the Canadian Football League. He was also an assistant coach for the Argonauts and Vanderbilt Commodores after retiring from football due to osteoporosis.

References

External links
Just Sports Stats
Where Are They Now: Chris Gaines

Living people
1965 births
Players of American football from Nashville, Tennessee
American football linebackers
Canadian football linebackers
American players of Canadian football
Vanderbilt Commodores football players
Miami Dolphins players
Toronto Argonauts players
Vanderbilt Commodores football coaches
Toronto Argonauts coaches
Sportspeople from Nashville, Tennessee